is a Japanese actress and commercial model.

Biography

Career
From April 2004 to March 2005, Kato was a regular guest student on Italian Conversation, a 25-minute NHK TV program for beginners of Italian. She subsequently began appearing in commercials and became a popular model after appearing in Zexy, a Japanese bridal magazine, in 2004.

She appeared in the Japanese film Tokyo Tower with Jun Matsumoto in 2005. In late 2005, she began appearing in Japanese television dramas such as Kindaichi Shonen no Jikenbo. She later won the "Best Newcomer Award" for her performance in Dance Drill (also known as Dandori in Japan) in 2006.

In 2007, she starred in the Japanese drama Jotei with Hana Yori Dango actor Shota Matsuda. In 2008, Kato appeared in several TV dramas such as Oh! My Girl! with Mokomichi Hayami and Change with Takuya Kimura.

Early life
Kato's mother is Japanese and her father is Italian, both met at an Italian restaurant her father worked at in Yokohama. When Kato was five years old, the family moved to Naples, Italy. At that time she was able to speak and understand Italian, but has since forgotten almost every word. Hence, Kato was a regular guest student on Italian Conversation NHK TV program. She was named Rosa after her paternal grandmother.

Personal life
On 22 June 2011, Kato's 26th birthday, she married Japanese football player Daisuke Matsui. The next day, she announced on her blog her four-month pregnancy with their first child. She later gave birth to a son.

Filmography

Films

TV dramas

Awards
50th Television Drama Academy Awards: Best Newcomer (Dance Drill)

References

External links
 Official site 
 Rosa Kato in Nippon Cinema 
 

1985 births
Japanese female models
Japanese people of Italian descent
Living people
People from Kagoshima
21st-century Japanese actresses